This is a list of heads of diplomatic missions to Canada from other countries and entities, such as Ambassadors and High Commissioners, as listed by Global Affairs Canada.

Current Ambassadors and High Commissioners 
Below are the Ambassadors and High Commissioners to Canada, by order of precedence, .

Other offices

Chargé d'Affaires and other diplomatic heads

Vacant offices

See also  
 Ambassadors from Canada

References

Notes

External links
 Foreign Representatives in Canada: Ambassadors by Order of Precedence

List
Canada
List
Ambassadors and High Commissioners to Canada